Born in the USA is a predominantly two-hour American sports show that airs on Melbourne radio station SEN 1116.  It is hosted by American expats Steve Salisbury and Ed Wyatt.  It is one of the few non-Aussie Rules Football shows on the station and has been airing since September 2005. The National Basketball League awarded the show "Best Radio News Package" for the 2007-08 season.

Steve and Ed are occasionally joined by guests as they discuss all aspects of American sport and pop culture, usually with an edge and a degree of humour. (NFL, NBA, MLB, NHL and NCAA). They will often speak with Australian athletes with American connections, such as Australians who have played in the professional North American sports leagues. Occasionally, they will also speak with American sports journalists, usually those based on the west coast of the US, where Ed and Steve grew up.

Outside of the Australian football season, the first hour (9pm-10pm) is usually designated as "Above the Rim" and is devoted mostly to talking about the NBL. Otherwise, during the AFL season, the show is often truncated to two hours to allow for additional AFL coverage.

From 10 pm, US sport generally takes over. The NBA and NFL tend to be the dominant topics of discussion during their respective seasons, with
collegiate sports, hockey, baseball, and other sports generally regulated to the later segments.

During the 11pm hour, The Born in the USA Trivia Challenge is hosted by Steve consisting of five general knowledge questions about American sport, usually based on current events of the week. The winner of the challenge receives prizes, usually free rounds of golf, movie passes, free dinners, CDs, DVDs, T-shirts, or similar items.

Occasionally, a second quiz contest with additional prizes may be held at the discretion of the hosts. One frequently used format consists of a common theme surrounding all of the music played fading in and out of commercial breaks which callers must correctly guess. An example might be a set of songs by bands from certain cities represented in the NFL or NBA playoffs.

The theme music for the show is "Born In The USA" by Bruce Springsteen. It comes after 'Fineys Final Siren' on a Sunday night.

The show is consistently one of SEN's highest-rated shows and attracts a variety of callers, many of whom have extensive knowledge and others who want to argue with the hosts. Some more notable callers are Greg from Caulfield, Steve from Sydney and Luke from East Hawthorn. Notable texters are Vic, Jason and the Leech. Despite being devoted primarily to American sport, the majority of the callers are native Australians, although American and Canadian ex-pats occasionally do phone in.

Australian radio programs
2000s Australian radio programs
2010s Australian radio programs